Josiah Smith (1704 – October 1781) was a clergyman in colonial South Carolina who championed the causes of the evangelical style of the Great Awakening and later American independence.

Smith was born in Charleston, South Carolina into a prominent family. His grandfather, Thomas, was a landgrave and governor of the province of South Carolina. He spent most of his childhood in Bermuda with his father.  Josiah graduated from Harvard in 1725. He received his ordination in 1726, returned to Charleston, and was successively pastor of Presbyterian churches in Bermuda, Cainhoy, and Charleston, South Carolina.  In 1730, he became involved in a theological dispute with Rev. Hugh Fisher of Dorchester, South Carolina on the subject of subscription to the Westminster Confession of Faith as well as the right of the individual to private judgment.  Both Smith and Fisher published sermons concerning the dispute.  In 1740, he championed the cause of George Whitefield and invited him to preach from his pulpit after he was refused admission to the local Episcopalian church. In 1749, he had a stroke which left him unable to speak well; however, he continued to write and publish sermons.

Rev. Smith sided with the rebelling colonists in the American Revolution.  During the Siege of Charleston, he was taken as a prisoner of war.  He was later paroled, but ordered to Philadelphia where he died.

Works
 Human Impositions Proved Unscriptural Or, The Divine Right of Private Judgment (1729)
 Solomon's Caution Against the Cup (1730)
 The Divine Right of Private Judgment Vindicated (1730)
 No New Thing to Be Slandered (1730)

References
 

American Presbyterians
American Revolutionary War prisoners of war held by Great Britain
American sermon writers
Clergy in the American Revolution
Harvard University alumni
Writers from Charleston, South Carolina
People of South Carolina in the American Revolution
South Carolina colonial people
1704 births
Josiah

1781 deaths